Édouard-Charles Fabre (February 28, 1827 – December 30, 1896) was Archbishop of Montreal in 1886 and of Sherbrooke and Saint-Hyacinthe in 1887.

Life
Fabre was the eldest of 11 children in an important Montreal business family. His mother, Luce Perrault, was involved in social works, charitable institutions, and home visits for the poor. His sister Hortense later married the lawyer and politician George-Étienne Cartier. 

He completed his classical studies at the Séminaire de Saint-Hyacinthe in 1843. His father, Édouard-Raymond Fabre, opposed his son's desire to become a priest and took the sixteen-year-old to live with his paternal aunt, Julie, in Paris so that the boy might see something of the world. She was married to the elder Fabre's business partner, Hector Bossange. Eventually, his father agreed that Édouard-Charles could study philosophy and theology at the seminary of Saint-Sulpice at Issy-les-Moulineaux.

In 1846 Fabre finished his studies at Saint-Sulpice, visited Rome and met Pope Pius IX. He returned to Montreal and resumed his theological studies at the episcopal palace under Jean-Charles Prince, coadjutor bishop of Montreal. After his ordination on 23 January 1850 at Saint-Jacques Cathedral, he was appointed assistant pastor in Sorel. Two year later, he was named parish priest at Saint-Joachim de la Pointe Claire. In 1855, he was installed as titular canon of the Cathedral.

Bishop
On April 1, 1873, Rome appointed him coadjutor of Bishop Bourget. He received his episcopal consecration at the Church of the Gesù (Montreal). Upon Bourget's resignation for health reasons, in 1876 Fabre became the third bishop of Montreal. He managed to put diocesan finances back on a sound basis. In 1886, Pope Leo XIII made him Archbishop of Montreal. The Diocese of Sherbrooke and that of Saint-Hyacinthe were made suffragan to Montreal. 
 
In 1882 he supported the establishment of a diocesan newspaper, La Semaine religieuse de Montréal. Fabre held very conservative views, but was also a pragmatist. During a smallpox epidemic in 1885  he directed his priests to reassure their parishioners about vaccines and not to interfere with the doctors. 

Archbishop Édouard-Charles Fabre died on December 30, 1896 in his episcopal residence at the age of 69.

The parish municipality of Saint-Édouard-de-Fabre, Quebec, was named after him. The Montreal metro station Fabre is also named after him.

References 

1827 births
1896 deaths
19th-century Roman Catholic archbishops in Canada
Roman Catholic archbishops of Montreal
French Quebecers
Pre-Confederation Quebec people